Andrew Fermin is a Trinidad and Tobago boxer who has won silver medals  at the Central American and Caribbean Games; in the Middleweight division in 2006   and in the Light heavyweight division in 2010. In 2007 he qualified  for the Pan American Games but lost to Alfonso Blanco in the quarter finals.

References

1984 births
Living people
Boxers at the 2007 Pan American Games
Boxers at the 2011 Pan American Games
Pan American Games competitors for Trinidad and Tobago
Trinidad and Tobago male boxers
Place of birth missing (living people)
Central American and Caribbean Games silver medalists for Trinidad and Tobago
Competitors at the 2006 Central American and Caribbean Games
Light-heavyweight boxers
Central American and Caribbean Games medalists in boxing